Humphrey August Mijnals (21 December 1930 – 27 July 2019) was a footballer who played international football for both the Netherlands and Suriname.

Career
Mijnals began his career with the Surinamese football club S.V. Robinhood in the 1950s, where he was one of the stars of the team and won four national titles. Then he played for six months for América Futebol Clube (PE) in Brazil. After this he returned to Suriname. Following his transfer in 1956 to Utrecht club USV Elinkwijk, he received a signing-on fee of $15,000 while his club received a transfer fee of 3000 guilders. The club contracted four more Surinamese footballers; his brother Frank Mijnals, Erwin Sparendam, Michel Kruin and Charley Marbach, collectively known as the "five-leaf clover". He was then transferred to VV DOS, remaining in Utrecht.

He debuted in the Netherlands national football team on 3 April 1960 in a home match against Bulgaria. Mijnals, nicknamed Minna, is best known for clearing a Bulgarian attempt on goal with an overhead kick.

In total, Mijnals played just three matches for the Netherlands, including a match against Suriname, because he came into conflict with the KNVB. The conflict arose after a training trip to South and Central America; he complained about the game and selection policy to a journalist, which resulted in him being placed on the list of unwanted players by the association.

Mijnals also played 45 times in the Suriname national football team. In 1999, he was elected Surinamese footballer of the century. On 24 August 2008, Mijnals also received Sports Medal of the city of Utrecht.

Mijnals died on 27 July 2019, at the age of 88.

References

1930 births
2019 deaths
Surinamese footballers
Suriname international footballers
Dutch footballers
Netherlands international footballers
Dual internationalists (football)
Surinamese emigrants to the Netherlands
Dutch sportspeople of Surinamese descent
Eredivisie players
Association football defenders
Dutch expatriate footballers
Surinamese expatriate footballers
Expatriate footballers in Brazil
Dutch expatriate sportspeople in Brazil
Surinamese expatriate sportspeople in Brazil
Surinamese expatriate sportspeople in the Netherlands
USV Elinkwijk players
VV DOS players
S.V. Robinhood players
SVB Eerste Divisie players
SC 't Gooi players
América Futebol Clube (PE) players